Western United Football Club is an Australian professional association football club based in Truganina, Melbourne. The club was formed in 2017 as Western Melbourne before it was shortly renamed to Western United. They became the third Victorian member admitted into the A-League in 2019.

Key
Key to league competitions:

 A-League Men (A-League) – Australia's top football league, established in 2004

Key to colours and symbols:

Key to league record:
 Season = The year and article of the season
 Pos = Final position
 Pld = Games played
 W = Games won
 D = Games drawn
 L = Games lost
 GF = Goals scored
 GA = Goals against
 Pts = Points

Key to cup record:
 En-dash (–) = Western United did not participate
 DNQ = The club did not qualify for a competition.
 Group = Group stage
 R32 = Round of 32
 R16 = Round of 16
 QF = Quarter-finals
 SF = Semi-finals
 RU = Runners-up
 W = Winners

Seasons

Footnotes

References

External links
 Ultimate A-League
 ALeagueStats.com

Western United FC
Western United FC seasons
Australian soccer club seasons